Heqaib (III) was an Ancient Egyptian local governor at Elephantine. He lived at the end of the 12th Dynasty around 1800 BC. He hold the titles governor and overseer of priests of Khnum, lord of the cataracts.

Heqaib was the son of a woman called Sat-tjeni and was perhaps the brother of Amenyseneb who followed him in the office of the local governor, both men have a woman called Sat-tjeni as mother. It has been suggested that Sat-tjeni was the daughter of a previous nomarch at Elephantine, Sarenput II.
Heqaib is mainly known from a statue dedicate by him into the local sanctuary of his distant predecessor Heqaib at Elephantine. The statue shows him kneeling with a vessel in each hand. His tomb was discovered in 2014 at Qubbet el-Hawa, with a painted coffin and the remains of a funerary mask.

References 

Officials of the Twelfth Dynasty of Egypt
Nomarchs
Overseers of the priests of Khnum